Ángel Carrasco was an Argentine sailor. He competed in the Star event at the 1948 Summer Olympics.

References

External links
 

Year of birth missing
Possibly living people
Argentine male sailors (sport)
Olympic sailors of Argentina
Sailors at the 1948 Summer Olympics – Star
Place of birth missing (living people)